ELB may refer to:
 Ellinair, a Greek airline
 Elyria-Lorain Broadcasting Co., an American holding company
 Étranges Libellules, a defunct French video game developer
 Euro League Baseball
 Las Flores Airport (Colombia)
 Education and Library Board, now part of the Education Authority of Northern Ireland